"Cant de la Senyera" ("Song of The Senyera [flag]") is a composition for mixed chorus with music by Lluís Millet, lyrics based on a poem by Joan Maragall, composed expressly to be the hymn of the Orfeó Català choral group in the Catalonia community of Spain. It debuted at Montserrat in 1896, in a ceremony in honor of the Senyera, a traditional flag of the crown of Aragon which serves as the basis for other regional flags, including that of Catalonia.

Prohibition
The song was prohibited from 1939 to 1960 under the regime of Spanish caudillo Francisco Franco, as part of Franco's ban on Catalan language and culture. In 1960, while Franco was on a rare visit to Barcelona, four of his ministers, including Minister of the Interior Camilo Alonso Vega, attended the centennial ceremony for Maragall at the Palace of Catalan Music. The Civil Governor of Barcelona, Felipe Acedo, had authorized the concert, but forbade the playing of the "Cant" despite its being based on Maragall's work. The orchestra played a musical arrangement of Cant de la Senyera, upon which a number of Catalan nationalists stood up and sang along, marking a key turning point in the history of Catalan nationalism, a happening known as the Fets del Palau de la Música ("Events of the Palace of Music"). Several people were arrested for singing along, and one, Jordi Pujol, who would later become President of Catalonia, was arrested, tortured, and sentenced to seven years in prison.

Role
The song served as a de facto Catalan anthem, alongside "Els Segadors", though the latter was only made official in 1993.

Lyrics

References

Catalan music
Catalan nationalism
Flag anthems